Sultan Mastura, officially the Municipality of Sultan Mastura (Maguindanaon: Ingud nu Sultan Mastura; Iranun: Inged a Sultan Mastura), is a 5th class municipality in the province of Maguindanao del Norte, Philippines. According to the 2020 census, it has a population of 25,331 people.

It was created by virtue of the Muslim Mindanao Autonomy Act No. 89, carved from the municipality of Sultan Kudarat. The law was submitted on September 13, 1999, and lapsed into law on November 13, 1999. It was ratified by the people of Sultan Mastura through plebiscite on March 15, 2003. Its corporate existence started on April 28, 2003.

It was part of the province of Shariff Kabunsuan from October 2006 until its nullification by the Supreme Court in July 2008.

Geography

Barangays
Sultan Mastura is politically subdivided into 13 barangays.

Balut
Boliok
Bungabong
Dagurongan
Kirkir
Macabico (Macabiso)
Namuken
Simuay/Seashore
Solon
Tambo
Tapayan
Tariken
Tuka

Climate

Demographics

Economy

References

External links
 Official Website of Sultan Mastura Municipality
 Sultan Mastura Profile at the DTI Cities and Municipalities Competitive Index
 MMA Act No. 89 : An Act Creating the Municipality of Sultan Mastura in the Province of Maguindanao
 [ Philippine Standard Geographic Code]
 Philippine Census Information
 Local Governance Performance Management System

Municipalities of Maguindanao del Norte